Eutzsch is a village and a former municipality in Wittenberg district in Saxony-Anhalt, Germany. Since 1 January 2010, it is part of the town Kemberg.

Geography 
Eutzsch lies about 6 km south of Lutherstadt Wittenberg.

History 
Eutzsch had its first documentary mention in 965 under the name Usizi.

Economy and transportation
Federal Highway (Bundesstraße) B 2 between Wittenberg and Bad Düben, and the B 100 both run straight through the community. Eutzsch's railway station is on the line running from Berlin to Nuremberg and Munich.

External links 
Administrative community's website

Former municipalities in Saxony-Anhalt
Kemberg